Inventing Myself is the fourth studio album by New Zealand recording artist Stan Walker. It was released on 25 October 2013, by Sony Music Australia. It is Walker's first album to be released exclusively in New Zealand. The album was preceded by the singles "Take It Easy", "Bulletproof" and "Inventing Myself".

Background
Walker had been working on Inventing Myself for over two years and it is his first album he has worked on in New Zealand.

Singles
"Take It Easy" was released as the album's first single on 30 November 2012. The song peaked at number five on the New Zealand Singles Chart and was certified double platinum for selling 30,000 copies. "Take It Easy" was also used in the New Zealand box office hit Mt Zion. "Bulletproof" was released as the second single from Inventing Myself on 31 May 2013; it reached number two in New Zealand and was certified platinum. "Inventing Myself" was released as the third single from the album on 9 July 2013. It debuted on the New Zealand Singles Chart at number 27 on 22 July 2013, but fell off the chart the next week. "Like It's Over" was released as the fourth single on 4 October 2013. It peaked at number 19 on 4 November 2013.

Track listing

Personnel
 Vocal credits
Stan Walker – lead vocals
Ruby Frost – featured artist
Ria Hall – featured artist
Diafrix – featured artist

Charts

Weekly charts

Year-end charts

Release history

References

2013 albums
Stan Walker albums
Sony Music Australia albums
Albums produced by Sam de Jong